Somerset is a home rule-class city in Pulaski County, Kentucky, United States. The city population was 11,924 according to the 2020 census. It is the seat of Pulaski County.

History
Somerset was first settled in 1798 by Thomas Hansford and received its name from Somerset County, New Jersey, where some of the early settlers had formerly lived. Somerset became the Pulaski County seat in 1802, and was incorporated as a city in 1887. A smaller battle was fought nearby at Dutton's Hill in 1863. In 1875 tracks for the Southern Railroad were completed and Somerset saw a population growth and an increase in industry. In the late 1930s and early 1940s, library services were provided by the pack horse library. The completion of Lake Cumberland in 1950 transformed Somerset from a sleepy rural community into a recreation center.

The Center for Rural Development in Somerset was established in 1996.  It is a 501c(3) nonprofit organization that describes its mission as follows: "to provide leadership that stimulates innovative and sustainable economic development solutions and a better way of life for the citizens we serve." The center's programs and services focus on public safety, arts & culture, leadership, and technology.

Geography
Somerset is located at  (37.082966, −84.609387), and the downtown (central) part of the city is at an elevation of 974 feet above sea level. The city is located at the eastern end of Kentucky's Mississippian Plateau (or Pennyroyal Plateau); however, the micropolitan area extends eastward into the Appalachian Plateau (or Eastern Kentucky Coalfield), and northward to Kentucky's Outer Bluegrass region. Thus, the area shows variations in landforms and scenery.

Somerset is also near Cumberland Falls and the Big South Fork National River and Recreation Area; its tourism industries are, in part, due to its scenic and varied landscape.

Climate

The climate in this area is characterized by hot, humid summers and generally mild to cool winters.  According to the Köppen Climate Classification system, Somerset has a humid subtropical climate, abbreviated "Cfa" on climate maps.

Somerset's climate is warm during summer when temperatures tend to be in the 80s and mild during winter when temperatures tend to be in the 30s and 40s.

Rainfall is fairly evenly distributed throughout the year. Snowfall typically occurs between the months of December and February, though on record as early as October and as late as May.

Demographics

The major demographic differences between the city and the micropolitan area relate to income, housing composition and age.  The micropolitan area, as compared to the incorporated city, is more suburban in flavor and has a younger housing stock, a higher income, and contains most of the area's school age population.  Over the last 20 years, housing growth has occurred along the Fishing Creek tributary of Lake Cumberland, which lies just to the west of the City of Somerset, and along the main body of Lake Cumberland between the City of Burnside and Fishing Creek.  Much of the Somerset area housing growth in the last 20 years is lake-oriented.

As of the census of 2000, there were 11,352 people, 4,831 households, and 2,845 families residing within the City of Somerset (proper). The population density for the city proper was 1,007.1 persons per square mile (388.9/km). A karst valley occupies the south-central portion of the city, taking up about 25% of the land area; this valley is quasi-industrialized and also contains parks and recreational facilities; most of the population lies to the east and north of this valley in fairly compact residential neighborhoods that have a real population density of about 1,800 persons per square mile. The racial makeup of the city was 94.16% White, 3.66% Black, 0.18% Native American, 0.71% Asian, 0.26% from other races, and 1.02% from two or more races. Hispanic or Latino of any race were 0.99% of the population.

There were 4,831 households, out of which 26.6% had children under the age of 18 living with them, 41.3% were married couples living together, 15.0% had a female householder with no husband present, and 41.1% were non-families. 37.8% of all households were made up of individuals, 18.4% had someone living alone who was 65 years of age or older. The average household size was 2.13 and the average family size was 2.80.

In the city proper, 20.6% were under the age of 18, 8.5% were in the age cohort from 18 to 24, 27.8% from 25 to 44, 21.7% from 45 to 64, and 21.4% who were 65 years of age or older. The median age was 40 years. For every 100 females, there were 82.5 males. For every 100 females age 18 and over, there were 78.5 males.

The median income for a household in the city was $22,362, and the median income for a family was $31,226. Males had a median income of $28,536 versus $20,194 for females. The per capita income for the city was $14,048. About 16.4% of families and 22.1% of the population were below the poverty line, including 31.3% of those under age 18 and 18.9% of those age 65 or over.

Economy
Tourism is important to Somerset, due to its proximity to Lake Cumberland. Lake Cumberland generated approximately $150 million in revenue each year as of 2013, though the industry has been greatly impacted in recent years by the U.S. Army Corps of Engineers' work on the Wolf Creek Dam.  Since 2007, Lake Cumberland has been at low levels to facilitate the Corps work. The city holds the annual Master Musicians Festival. The Civil War Battle of Mill Springs took place in nearby Nancy. In November 2006, the Mill Springs Battlefield Visitor Center and Museum opened. Begun in 2001, Somernites Cruise is a monthly classic car show held the fourth weekend of the months April through October.

In 2006, a new  medical park, called MedPark West, was finished near the Lake Cumberland Regional Hospital (LCRH). LCRH is one of the largest in the state. LCRH is a JCAHO-accredited hospital with 304 beds. A virtual online tour of the hospital is available. A ventilator care facility, Rockcastle Regional Hospital and Respiratory Care Center, is in adjoining Rockcastle County.

On June 26, 2012, Somerset city voters approved the sale of alcoholic beverages by a margin of 2,167 "Wet" votes to 1,464 "Dry" votes. This vote allows for packaged liquor and beer sales, and sales by the drink at restaurants and bars.

In 2014, a municipal-run filling station, the Somerset Fuel Center, was opened in response to persistently high local gas prices. "The price of gas will be based on an average regional price and will include a small markup to cover costs, the mayor said." In addition to serving local residents, it was hoped the station would encourage visits to nearby Lake Cumberland for fishing and boating.

Nearby Somerset, located off Highway 461, is the Valley Oak Technology Complex, an industrial center. Housed there are such companies as SafeAuto.

Employers
Major employers in the Somerset area include:

Blackboard
Hendrickson
Prairie Farms Dairy
Safe Auto Insurance Company
Texas Roadhouse

Education
There are schools in the county, served by two main school systems – Somerset Independent and Pulaski County.  Students living within the city limits typically fall under the Somerset Independent school district.  The Pulaski County School System contains Pulaski County High School (PCHS) and Southwestern High School (SWHS), which was built in 1993 to alleviate overcrowding.

There are other smaller schools, including Tabernacle Christian Academy, Science Hill Independent, Somerset Christian School, and Saline Christian Academy. The three main high schools are Southwestern, Pulaski County, and Somerset. There is a local two-year college, Somerset Community College, part of the Kentucky Community and Technical College System (KCTCS). Somerset Community College offers one of the few Aviation Maintenance Technology programs (Airframe and Powerplant) in Kentucky.

Somerset has a lending library, a branch of the Pulaski County Public Library.

Popular culture

 In 2004, Somerset was featured on the television series City Confidential. The episode was described as "A drug dealer plots to murder a small-town sheriff."
The FX drama Justified mentions Somerset in Seasons 1, 2, 3, and 5. A bank robbery scene was filmed in downtown Somerset during Season 1.
 On April 16, 2012, the ID Channel featured the city on the show Sins and Secrets. The episode was described as "The 2002 assassination of Sheriff Sam Catron of Pulaski County, Ky., and the investigation that nabbed his killers are discussed."
 Somerset has also been featured on television as a result of the Somernites Cruise event. Somernites Cruise has been featured on My Classic Car on the Speed Channel, "Horsepower TV" on the Spike TV network, Car Crazy on the Speed Channel, "Mothers Car Show Series" on ESPN2 and the "Lokar Car Show Series" on Fox Sports.
 In 2019 Somerset was featured in season 2 of the docuseries "Hellier". The series investigated the mysterious and strange happenings in Somerset, and Pulaski County.

Notable people

 James L. Allen – one of the founders of the management consulting firms Booz Allen Hamilton and Strategy
 Harriette Simpson Arnow – author
 Howard H. Baker – U.S. congressman for the state of Tennessee
 John Sherman Cooper – former U.S. senator, liberal Republican, and member of the Warren Commission
 Jack Daws – artist 
 Daniel Dutton – artist, lyricist, and composer
 Bud Foster – former Virginia Tech Hokies football defensive coordinator
 Lance Fuller – actor
 Jack I. Gregory – General, USAF, Commander in Chief Pacific Air Forces 1986–1988
 Vermont Garrison – U.S. Air Force pilot in three wars who achieved "ace" status in both World War II and Korean War
Reggie Hanson – former NBA player for the Boston Celtics
 Chuck Hardwick – politician and businessman, served as Speaker of the New Jersey General Assembly
 Lewis G. Longsworth – chemist, biochemist, recipient of the 1968 American Chemical Society Award in Chromatography and Electrophoresis
 Ted McCarty – electrical engineer known for his innovations and design work at the Gibson Guitar Corporation 
 Monte Montague – stage and film actor 
 Edwin P. Morrow – Governor of Kentucky, 1919–1923
 Tunstall Quarles – pioneer settler of Somerset, lawyer, state representative, state senator. Organized first bank in Somerset
 Venus Ramey – Miss America 1944
 Lloyd B. Ramsey, (1918–2016), Major General United States Army, Commander 23rd Infantry Division (United States) (1969–1970), United States Army Provost Marshal General (1970–1974)
 Red Roberts – American football player and coach
 Tommy Lee Wallace – film producer, director, and screenwriter

References

External links

City of Somerset Website
City Guide of Somerset, KY
Commonwealth Journal
Somerset-Pulaski County Chamber of Commerce

Cities in Kentucky
Cities in Pulaski County, Kentucky
County seats in Kentucky
Populated places established in 1798
1798 establishments in Kentucky